Savard is a geographic township in the Canadian province of Ontario, located in the Timiskaming District. It is located immediately west of the municipality of Chamberlain.

A designated place served by a local services board, Savard had a population of 223 in the Canada 2006 Census.

Demographics 

References 

Communities in Timiskaming District
Designated places in Ontario
Geographic townships in Ontario
Local services boards in Ontario